Trinity Independent School District is a public school district based in Trinity, Texas; a portion of the district extends into northern Walker County.

In 2009, the school district was rated "academically acceptable" by the Texas Education Agency.

Schools
Lansberry Elementary (Grades PK-5)
Trinity Junior High School (Grades 6-8)
Trinity High School (Grades 9-12)

General information
The district serves approximately 1174 students (as of Fall 2006), and shows a slow growth in enrollment over the past decade.

References

External links
Trinity ISD

School districts in Trinity County, Texas
School districts in Walker County, Texas